Events from the year 1636 in France

Incumbents
 Monarch – Louis XIII

Events
20 March – Treaty of Wismar
5 August – Crossing of the Somme

Births

Full date missing
Noël Bouton de Chamilly, Marshal of France (died 1715)
Charles de La Fosse, painter (died 1716)

Deaths

Full date missing
Pierre Belain d'Esnambuc, trader and adventurer (born 1585)
Paul Hay du Chastelet, magistrate, orator and writer (born 1592)
Crespin Carlier, organ builder (born c.1560)
Louise Bourgeois Boursier, midwife (born 1563)
Jean Hotman, Marquis de Villers-St-Paul, diplomat (born 1552)

See also

References

1630s in France